The 1926–27 season was the club's 7th official football season and the 24th year of the club's existence. They finished 3rd in the 4th year of the İstanbul Football League, behind the champion Galatasaray and runner up Fenerbahçe.

External links
Turkish Soccer

Beşiktaş J.K. seasons
Besiktas